Pikin Guerrero Airport  is a rural airstrip serving the hamlet of Pikin Guerrero in the Chontales Department of Nicaragua.

See also

 List of airports in Nicaragua
 Transport in Nicaragua

References

External links
OpenStreetMap - Pikin Guerrero Airport
 HERE Maps - Pikin Guerrero

Airports in Nicaragua